Delorn Edison Johnson (born 15 September 1988) is a cricketer from St. Vincent. He is a left-arm fast bowler who plays first-class cricket for Windward Islands. He has played for West Indies Under-19 cricket team and West Indies A cricket team.

References

External links

Living people
1988 births
Windward Islands cricketers
Saint Vincent and the Grenadines cricketers
Trinbago Knight Riders cricketers
Saint Lucia Kings cricketers